Sphaerellothecium stereocaulorum is a species of lichenicolous fungus in the Phyllachoraceae family.

Distribution
Sphaerellothecium stereocaulorum has been found in Alaska, Canada and Greenland.

Host species and symptoms
Sphaerellothecium stereocaulorum is known to infect the naked stems of Stereocaulon groenlandicum and Stereocaulon rivulorum.

References

Sordariomycetes
Fungi described in 2008
Fungi of Canada
Fungi of Greenland
Fungi of the United States
Lichenicolous fungi
Taxa named by Mikhail Petrovich Zhurbenko
Taxa named by Dagmar Triebel